Eusyntheta brevicornis is a species of beetle in the family Cerambycidae, and the only species in the genus Eusyntheta. It was described by Bates in 1889.

References

Lamiini
Beetles described in 1889